Mudukulathur is a panchayat town in the Ramanathapuram district of the Indian state of Tamil Nadu

Demography
 India census, Mudukulathur had a population of 13,130. Males constituted 50% of the population and females 50%.  Mudukulathur had an average literacy rate of 70%, higher than the national average of 59.5%: male literacy was 76%, and female literacy was 65%. 12% of the population was under 6 years of age.

In earlier times, the town used to be called Mutthukulathur, meaning "the town with pearls in its lakes" in Tamil with obvious reference to the three ponds "oorani". However the name of the town changed over the years to Mudhukulathur meaning "town of oldest ponds" in an ironical reference to the absence of the pearls and the ponds drying up.

Economy
The local economy produces commodities such as rice, chilli, cotton and seasonal vegetables.  The economy of the town is largely dependent on Gulf money, wages from government salaries, agriculture, labour and trade. Major local economy is based on agriculture.

Governance
It is a part of the Mudukulathur (state assembly constituency). In 2021, R.S.Rajakannappan from Dravida Munnetra Kazhagam was elected.

Infrastructure

Water-Road-Power
Water is very scarce in this town for many decades now.
The local town administration takes care of supply of drinking water to homes.  The water is supplied every day for few hours in the morning.  This water is mostly used for drinking and cooking.  In summer season, supply of water is limited to 2–4 days in a week.  Some people even buy water from local vendors.

This town has a well-developed road network to connect with nearby towns and villages but the quality of the roads not worthy of a mention except for the road that runs to Paramakkudi.

Most of the homes in this town are connected to the state electricity network TNEB.

Transport
The only means of transportation is by Road using public transport services operated by state transport corporation and private players like Jayavilas and Shanmugam Bus Transport companies.
In the recent years, people use taxis and autos for local commute.  A newly constructed bus stand, which has statues of leaders of two communities reflecting the social arrangement of present times, serves the commuters.

Health
This town being a taluk headquarters, has a government hospital and a private clinic(Parvin clinic) run by a lady doctor for many years, some private hospitals.

Education

Government And Government Aided Educational Institutions

Self-Financing Educational Institutions

References

Cities and towns in Ramanathapuram district